Ccerayoc (possibly from Quechua q'ira a species of wild lupin, Lupinus platiphyllus) is a  mountain in the Urubamba mountain range in the Andes of Peru. It is located in the Cusco Region, Calca Province, in the districts Calca and Lares. It lies immediately east of Sahuasiray (Colque Cruz) and northeast of Condorhuachana.

See also 
 Lares trek

References 

Mountains of Peru
Mountains of Cusco Region